John Bickley was Member of the Parliament of England for Stafford in 1529.

References

Year of birth missing
Year of death missing
English MPs 1529–1536
Members of the Parliament of England (pre-1707) for Stafford